Henry Fanshawe (1634–1685) was an English politician.

He was the third son of Sir Thomas Fanshawe (later 1st Viscount Fanshawe) by his second wife.  His brothers were Thomas Fanshawe, 2nd Viscount Fanshawe, Charles Fanshawe, 4th Viscount Fanshawe and Simon Fanshawe, 5th Viscount Fanshawe. He was educated at the Middle Temple.

He was a Member of Parliament for Penryn from May 1685 until his death in August 1685.

References 

1634 births
1685 deaths
Younger sons of viscounts
English MPs 1685–1687
Fanshawe family